Kevin Ruiz Castellanos (born 29 June 1991) is a German footballer who currently plays for Türkspor Neu-Ulm.

References

External links
 

1991 births
Living people
German footballers
VfR Aalen players
FC Nöttingen players
3. Liga players
Regionalliga players
Association football midfielders
FC Memmingen players
Sportspeople from Ulm
Footballers from Baden-Württemberg